Charles Herbert Woodbury (July 14, 1864 – January 21, 1940), was an American marine painter.

Biography 

Charles H. Woodbury was born in Lynn, Massachusetts, where his earliest work was part of the oeuvre of the group later known as the Lynn Beach Painters. While an undergraduate at MIT he became a regular exhibitor at, and at 19 the youngest member of, the Boston Art Club . After graduation from the Massachusetts Institute of Technology (with degree in Mechanical Engineering),  in 1886 Woodbury had great success painting up the New England coast and in the towns and beaches of Nova Scotia and exhibiting the results. From January to June 1891 he was a pupil of the Académie Julian in Paris, after which he went to Holland, where he studied the techniques of the modern Dutch painters.  Upon his return to New England he settled in Boston for his winter studio and spent his summers in the small fishing village of Ogunquit, Maine; there he founded one of the most successful of the summer art colony schools that even survived his death. In 1928, Woodbury (along with Gertrude Fiske and a group of other area-artists) founded the Ogunquit Art Association.

Woodbury was one of the most sought-after teachers of his generation, having begun teaching on a regular basis while a freshman at M.I.T. Ironically, he had little formal training himself other than a few months of classes at the Academy Julian in Paris. Like Winslow Homer, another New England painter with an affinity for summers in Maine, he preferred "to work out his salvation with little help from others in his profession". Nevertheless, Woodbury maintained a close friendship with John Singer Sargent and a pleasant acquaintance with many of his contemporaries including J. Alden Weir and Childe Hassam.  He was president of the Boston Watercolor Society, and became associate of the National Academy of Design, New York in 1906 and a full member in 1907. His wife, Marcia Oakes Woodbury, born in 1865 at South Berwick, Maine, also became known as a painter. She died at the age of 49 in 1913.

He maintained a strong and consistent vision in his more than fifty years of professional life and became a master of compositions of the coast and sea. Woodbury’s many on-the-spot sketches and etchings produce a sense of motion through quick, sure-handed strokes. Seeing and understanding movement was fundamental to his art and teaching, and is reflected in his own maxim: "Paint in verbs, not nouns." In the words of his son David, Woodbury "...painted what he saw, satisfied that what he saw was really there, all in proper relationship, checked and rechecked by endless reference to the real world".

In his later years he spent his winters in the Caribbean sailing from island to island painting watercolor studies of the beaches and town backed by dramatic mountains and clouds. Over a large part of his career he made some of the most expressive etchings of any American artist of his time, completing more than 500 plates and teaching many younger artists to express themselves in this medium. He died on January 21, 1940, in Jamaica Plain, Massachusetts.

Woodbury engaged in over 100 solo exhibitions throughout his career, and was included in all of the major invitational and juried shows throughout the country. His work may be found currently in The Art Institute of Chicago, The Museum of Fine Arts, Boston, and New York’s Metropolitan Museum of Art among many others.

Chronology 

1864	Born in Lynn, MA on July 14. 
1881	At 17, becomes the youngest honoree of the Boston Art Club.
1882	Begins studies at MIT.
1886	Graduates from MIT with a degree in mechanical engineering.
1887	Takes a studio in Boston and teaches drawing.
1888	First recorded visit to Ogunquit, ME.
1890	Marries former student, Marcia Oakes. They travel together to Europe.
1891	Studies at the Académie Julian under Boulanger and Lefebvre.
1896	Moves to Ogunquit with Marcia after the birth of their son, David.
1897 Takes Second Prize for Mid-Ocean painting at the Tennessee Centennial Exposition

1898	Founds his Ogunquit School.
1906	Elected an associate of the National Academy of Design.
1907	Elected full member of the National Academy of Design.
1913	Death of wife, Marcia Oakes.
1928    Founds (along with Gertrude Fiske and other Ogunquit-area artists) the Ogunquit Art Association.
1940	Dies in Jamaica Plain, MA on January 21.

Collections 

Addison Gallery of American Art, MA 
Art Institute of Chicago, IL
Boston Public Library, MA 
Boston Athenaeum, MA
Bowdoin College Museum of Art, ME
Chrysler Museum of Art, VA
Cleveland Museum of Art, OH
Currier Gallery of Art, NH
El Paso Museum of Art, TX
Farnsworth Art Museum, ME
Fine Arts Museum of San Francisco, CA
Harvard University Art Museums, MA
Isabella Stewart Gardner Museum, MA
Maier Museum of Art at Randolph College, VA
Metropolitan Museum of Art, NY
Museum of Fine Arts, Boston, MA
Ogunquit Museum of American Art, Ogunquit, ME
 
Portland Museum of Art, ME
Rhode Island School of Design – Museum of Art, RI
San Diego Museum of Art, CA
Smithsonian American Art Museum, Washington, DC
Virginia Museum of Fine Arts, Richmond, VA
Private collection of Michael Maglaras

Exhibitions 

1887	J. Eastman Chase Gallery, MA 
1902	Art Institute of Chicago, IL
1910	Cincinnati Art Museum, OH
1910	City Art Museum of St. Louis, MO
1912	Buffalo Fine Arts Academy, NY
1913	Detroit Museum of Art, MI
1925	Frederick Keppel & Co., NY
1939	Winchester Public Library, MA
1940	Cleveland Museum of Art, OH
1945	Museum of Fine Arts, Boston, MA
1968	Adelson Galleries Inc., MA
1978	Vose Galleries of Boston, MA
2016 York Public Library, York,  MA

Memberships 

Boston Art Club 
Guild of Boston Artists
National Academy of Design
Ogunquit Art Association
Salmagundi Club
Society of American Artists 
Watercolor Club of Boston

Suggested Resources 

Gammell, R.H. Ives. The Boston Painters 1900-1930. Orleans, MA: Parnassus Press, 1986. 
Howlett, D. Roger. "The Lynn Beach Painters." Boston: Copley Square Press, 1998.
Jarzombek, Nancy Allyn. Boston Art Club: 1855-1950. Boston, MA: Vose Galleries of Boston, 2000.
Loria, Joan, and Warren A. Seamans. "Earth, Sea and Sky – Charles H. Woodbury – Artist and Teacher, 1864-1940," exhibition catalogue. Cambridge, Massachusetts: The MIT Museum, 1998.
Woodbury, Charles H. and Elizabeth W. Perkins. The Art of Seeing: Mental Training Through Drawing. New York: C. Scribner’s Sons, 1925.
Young, George M. and Charles H. Woodbury. Force through Delicacy: the Life and Art of Charles H. Woodbury. Portsmouth, NH: Peter E. Randall Publisher, 1998.

References

External links
 Boston Public Library. Prints by Woodbury
 www.raisonne.org for a complete and detailed listing of all of Woodbury's etchings.
 Portrait of Charles H Woodbury by Hermann Dudley Murphy

1864 births
1942 deaths
19th-century American painters
American male painters
20th-century American painters
20th-century American male artists
People from Ogunquit, Maine
19th-century American male artists